Scott and Balfour Stores is a historic building in Savannah, Georgia, United States. Located in Savannah's Historic District, the addresses of some of the properties are East Bay Street, above Factors Walk, while others solely utilize the former King Cotton warehouses on River Street. As of February 2022, these are The Shrimp Factor, Bob's Your Uncle/Fannie's Your Aunt and Simply Savannah.

The property was built for Andrew Low, Robert Scott and John Balfour from 1823 to 1826. The top storey was added in the 1850s. Low was one of Savannah's most renowned cotton merchants,  in business by the late 18th century.

In a survey for the Historic Savannah Foundation, Mary Lane Morrison found the building to be of significant status.

The building stands adjacent to the George Anderson Stores at 402–410 East Bay Street.

River Street façade

See also
Buildings in Savannah Historic District

References

Commercial buildings in Savannah
Commercial buildings completed in the 19th century
Savannah Historic District